Douthwaite is a surname. Notable people with the surname include:

Arthur Henry Douthwaite (1896–1974), British physician and writer
Christopher Thomas Douthwaite (1875–1949), British politician
Harold Douthwaite (1900–1972), English cricketer
Pat Douthwaite (1934–2002), Scottish artist
Richard Douthwaite (1942–2011), British economist, ecologist, campaigner and writer